Nana Araba Apt (1942 – 2017) was a Ghanaian author, educator and social worker. 

She co-founded a charity organization, College for Ama in 2005 to help rural girls in Ghana go to school. She was the founding Dean of Academic Affairs at Ashesi University and a professor at University of Ghana before her death in 2017.

Bibliography

 Coping with Old Age in a Changing Africa: Social Change and the Elderly Ghanaian (1996)
 Learning How to Play to Win (2007) 
 Positioning Ghana: Challenges and Innovations (2015)

References

2017 deaths
1942 births
Academic staff of the University of Ghana
Academic staff of Ashesi University